The 1990 Giro di Lombardia was the 84th edition of the Giro di Lombardia cycle race and was held on 20 October 1990. The race started and finished in Monza. The race was won by Gilles Delion of the Helvetia–La Suisse team.

General classification

References

1990
1990 in road cycling
1990 in Italian sport
1990 UCI Road World Cup
October 1990 sports events in Europe